Harbin (112) is a Type 052 destroyer of the People's Liberation Army Navy. She was commissioned in May 1994.

Development and design 

Harbin is the lead ship of the Luhu class which was a significant improvement over the earlier Luda class and it is said to be the first indigenous Chinese warship design approaching modern standards.

Her sister ship is Qingdao (113).

Construction and career 
Harbin was constructed by Jiangnan Shipyard and launched in 1991. She underwent a refit and upgrade in 2011.

In 1997 she visited the US stopping at Pearl Harbour before heading to California. The cost was part of a goodwill visit and constituted the first ever visit by a Chinese Navy ship to the United States mainland.

On 16 February 2013, Harbin, along with the Type 053H3 frigate Mianyang and the comprehensive supply ship Weishanhu formed the 14th Chinese naval escort flotilla which departed from the city of Qingdao to conduct anti-piracy and escort missions in the Gulf of Aden and Somali waters.

Gallery

References 

1994 ships
Ships built in China
Type 052 destroyers